Sueños y Caramelos (English title: Sweets and Dreams) is a Mexican telenovela produced by Carlos Moreno Laguillo for Televisa in 2005. It is a remake of La Pícara Soñadora.

On January 24, 2005, Canal de las Estrellas started broadcasting Sueños y caramelos weekdays at 4:00pm, replacing Misión S.O.S. The last episode was broadcast on July 29, 2005 with Pablo y Andrea replacing it the following Monday.

Alessandra Rosaldo and René Strickler starred as adult protagonists, Nashla Aguilar and Luciano Corigliano starred as young protagonists, while Elizabeth Álvarez, Patricia Navidad and Pablo Magallanes starred as antagonists.

Plot
Since she lost her mother at 3 years of age, little Sofía has lived with her grandfather, Don Gonzalo, who is the security chief of a great department store called El Gran Almacén (Liverpool). Sofía is a girl with an extraordinary imagination that has a secret world.

As her apartment is inside the store, Sofia can enter in it at nights, when all employers have gone home. Here, in different departments, she can give free rein to her imagination, living wonderful adventures with her friends. During day, Sofia's life is the normal girl's life, she goes to school and has several good friends, she has formed a musical group with them.

“Sueños y Caramelos” is a fun story full of humour, romance, music and emotion, spiced with incredible mischiefs of a group of sympathetic children and... Why not?... A little of magic too.

Cast
 
Alessandra Rosaldo as Fátima Goméz
René Strickler as Rafael Monraz Guillén
Nashla Aguilar as Sofía Ramírez
Luciano Corigliano as Mauricio Monraz
María Antonieta de las Nieves as Antonieta Guillén de Monraz
Raúl Padilla "Chóforo" as Don Gonzalo Gutiérrez
Manuel Saval as Augusto Monraz Guillén
Elizabeth Álvarez as Rocío de los Santos
Graciela Mauri as Maricarmen
Natalia Juárez as Lucía "Lucy" del Pilar Jurado
Miguel Pérez as Pedro/Guillermo "Memo"
Patricia Navidad as Débora León
Lourdes Reyes as Selene de Monraz
Nora Salinas as Guadalupe "Lupita"
Pablo Magallanes as Romeo
Óscar Bonfiglio as Carlo
Roberto Blandón as André San Martín/Andres Martínez
Alfonso Iturralde as Gerardo
Lalo "El Mimo" as Fregonal "Precioso Jefazo"
Polo Ortín as Segundo
Julio Vega as Lauro
José Elías Moreno as Mauro
Zully Keith as Corina de los Santos
Alejandro Ibarra as Oswaldo Nerin
Alejandro Aragón as Sandro
Rosita Pelayo as Lorenza
Ricardo de Pascual as Tapón
Luis Gatica as Máximo Guerra
Perla Corona as Adela de Guerra
Daniel Continente as Hernán Ibargoengouttia
Roberto Miquel as Roque Felix
Eduardo Liñan as General Ruben Carrillo
Macarena Miguel as Betina Monraz
Ximena Orozco as Ximena "La niña muñeca"
Mauricio Bueno as Juan López
Diego Lara as Reynaldo
Martha Sabrina as Bianca
Rafael Valdez as Memo
Santiago Mirabent as Rogelio
María Fernanda Sasian as Ana Valeria
Gisselle Kuri as Maricruz Lechuga
Ana Valeria Cerecedo as Conchita
Ana Paulina Cáceres as Laura
Mariely Sosa as Iris
Alejandro Lago as Clemente Cerillo
David Ortega as El Flaco
Marcela Páez as Teacher Ana
Beatriz Monroy as Inocencia
Rosángela Balbó as Magda
María Prado as Lucha Dora
Aída Hernández as Petra
Fernando Nesme as Yamil
Patricia Martínez as Ángela
Alejandra Jurado as Gloria
Haydée Navarra as Soraya
Pepe Magaña as Buenavista
Gloria Izaguirre as Miroslava
Roxana Saucedo as Denisse
Javier Herranz as Eladio
Alejandro Ruiz as David
Raquel Morell as Rosaura
Conrado Osorio as Jaime
Mané Macedo as Irma
Citalli Galindo as Carmen
Charly Valentino as Ronco
María Alicia Delgado as Ady
Martín Rojas as Cabo Tejada
Benjamín Islas as Valerio Rojo
Roberto Tello as El Tracala
Moisés Suárez as Delfino
Jorge Pascual Rubio as Lic. Barbosa
José Antonio Estrada as Don Pablo
Jorge Robles as Goyo
Loreta as Karlita
Sugey Ábrego as Ada
Zamorita as Abuelo del Flaco
Memo Dorantes as Fachan
Tristán as El Gran Protector
Guadalupe Bolaños as Jovita
Lucia Fernanda as Olgita
Fernando Juramillo as Genaro
Daniela Zavala as Felipa
Florencia de Saracho as Ashley Monraz
Jorge Alberto Bolaños as Comandante
Ismael Fardín as Assistant police
Ricardo Silva as Sr. Moreno

Soundtrack 
The soundtrack from the telenovela was released in 2005. The labels were Capitol Records, EMI and Televisa. It was produced by Chacho Gaytán, Xavier Asalí, Mauricio L. Arriaga and Jorge Eduardo Murguía. The following songs were included.

 Es Tiempo de Jugar
 Gran Día
 El Gallinero
 La Tabla del 7
 Maniquie
 Los Modales
 Así Son Mis Amigos
 El Zorrito Pinto
 Payasos
 El Juego del Rock
 La Princesa y el Bufón
 Chiki Tiki Wong

This songs were not included in the soundtrack.
Sueños y Caramelos
En el circo

Awards

References

External links

 at esmas.com 

2005 telenovelas
Mexican telenovelas
2005 Mexican television series debuts
2005 Mexican television series endings
Television shows set in Mexico
Televisa telenovelas
Children's telenovelas
Television series reboots
Spanish-language telenovelas
Television series about orphans